Tutyr (Ossetian: Тутыр) is the Lord of the wolves in Ossetian mythology, his name comes from the name of Saint Theodore Tiron.

It is believed that Tutyr often quarrels with the patron of sheep Fælværa. The Ossetians believed that wolves without the will of Tutyr could not attack livestock, so if you call on the name of Tutyr at the time when wolves attack livestock, then they should run away. To save cattle from the attack of wolves people also tried to propitiate Tutyr with the annual "Tutyrta" holiday during the first three days of Great Lent. On the first day of the holiday, shepherds kept a very strict fast. On the eve of the holiday, a sacrifice was made to Tutyr in the form of a goat or a ram, and Tutyr was asked not to send wolves. If this custom was ignored, it was believed that Tutyr would become angry and would certainly order the wolves to exterminate the cattle and even the man himself, who had forgotten to sacrifice to Tutyr.

In the Nart saga Tutyr is a friend of the Narts, whom he repeatedly helped. For example, Sosruko was hardened in wolf's milk.

See also 

 Fælværa
 Ossetian mythology

References 

Ossetian mythology

Mythological characters
Supernatural beings identified with Christian saints
Wolves in folklore, religion and mythology